The 2019 Thailand Amateur League (Thai:ไทยแลนด์ อเมเจอร์ลีก) is the third season of the League competition since its establishment in 2017. It is in the fifth tier of the Thai football league system. This season has had 230 clubs join the nation-wide amateur tournament.

Tournament format 
The tournament will be divided into 12 sub-regions with 3 stages in each sub-regions.

Qualification stage: This method will be applied when there are more than eight clubs in a sub-regions. This can be both one-legged knockout or on a round-robin basis depending on the number of participating clubs in the sub-regions.

Group stage: This round divided eight qualified clubs into two groups and play in single round-robin. Only the group winners will qualify for the next stage.

Final stage: The groups winners play against each other in one-legged match. The winners of the sub-region will play in the regional final against the winner from another sub-region which is in the same region to decide the club to promote to 2020 Thai League 4. 30-minute extra time and penalty shoot-out will be applied after the match is still in tie respectively.

Upper northern subregion

Qualification stage

Group A1

Group A2

Group A3

Group B1

Group B2

Group B3

Group stage

Group A

Group B

The actual result is a 2-2 draw, but Singh Nuea Chiang Mai was 0-2 forfeited due to fielding an ineligible player.

Lower northern subregion

Play-off round

Qualifying round

Group A1

Group A2

Group A3

* Northern Tak United won the first place of the group due to better disciplinary points than PL Tech Pitsanulok.

Group A4

Group B1

Group B2

Group B3

Group B4

Group stage

Group A

Group B

Upper northeastern subregion

Play-off round

Qualification round

Group A1

Group A2

 The match between Roi Et 2018 and Takhon City is cancelled due to Takhon City didn't show up at the match.

Group A3

1

Group A4

Group B1

Group B2

Group B3

Group B4

Group stage
Group A

Group B

Lower northeastern subregion

Play-off round

Qualifying round

Group A1

Group A2

Group A3

Group A4

Group B1

Group B2

Group B3

Group B4

Group stage
Group A

Group B

Upper eastern subregion

Qualifying round

Group A1

Group A2

Group B1

Group B2

Group stage
Group A

Group B

Lower eastern subregion

Qualification round

Group A1

Group A2

Group B1

Group B2

Group stage

Group A

Group B

Bangkok Metro

Play-off round

Qualifying round

Group A1

Group A2

Group A3

Group A4

Group B1

Group B2

Group B3

* Royal Thai Army Headquarters withdraws, so all match which involves Royal Thai Army Headquarters is cancelled, and Phoenix F.C. qualified to the next round.

Group B4

Group stage

Group A

Group B

Perimeter region

Qualification stage

Group A1

Group A2

Group A3

Group B1

Group B2

Group B3

Group stage

Group A

Group B

Upper western subregion

Qualification stage

Group A1

Group A2

Group A3

*Samut Sakhon Warriors withdraw, so all match which Samut Sakhon Warriors will play is cancelled.
** Saraburi Warriors is forfeited due to fielding ineligible players at the match, the actual result is 2-1 to Saraburi Warriors.

Group B1

Group B2

Group B3

Group stage

Group A

Group B

Lower western subregion

Qualifying round

Group A1

Group A2

Group A3

Group B1

Group B2

*Samut Sakhon City withdraws, so all match which include Samut Sakhon City is cancelled, and KU Kampang San qualified to the next round.

Group B3

Group stage

Group A

Group B

Upper southern subregion

Qualifying round

Group A1

Group B1

*Surat Thani United withdrew, so Plai Phraya City and Khun Thalay SRU qualified to group stage.

Group stage

Group A

Group B

Lower southern subregion

Group stage 
Group A

Group B

Subregional final 
The actual finalist Singha Nuea Chiang Mai was  0-2 forfeited by JT due to fielding an ineligible player.

Final

Northern region

Northeastern region

Eastern region

Bangkok & fields region

Western region

Southern region

Championship stage

Group A

Group B

Final

Promoted clubs 
According to FA Thailand's declaration about promoting clubs to the 2020 Thai League 4 (T4) by considerate number of participating clubs in each regions, FAT revealed that there will be nine clubs to promote to the next season of T4 League.

 SA Pitsanulok (Northern winner)
 Chiangrai Lanna (Northern runner-up)
Northern Tak United (Northern third place)
 UD Nonghan (Northeastern winner)
 ACDC (Eastern winner)
 Royal Thai Air Force (Bangkok & fields winner)
 Kanjanapat (Western winner)
 Singha Rakhang Thong Muang Kan (Western runner-up)
 Songkhla (Southern winner)
 Patong City (Southern runner-up)

References

External links 
 Supersub Thailand 
 Thailive 
 Thailand Amateur League Fanpage on Facebook 

2019 in Thai football leagues
Thailand Amateur League seasons